In applied mathematics, the starred transform, or star transform, is a discrete-time variation of the Laplace transform, so-named because of the asterisk or "star" in the customary notation of the sampled signals. 
The transform is an operator of a continuous-time function , which is transformed to a function  in the following manner:

where  is a Dirac comb function, with period of time T.

The starred transform is a convenient mathematical abstraction that represents the Laplace transform of an impulse sampled function , which is the output of an ideal sampler, whose input is a continuous function, .

The starred transform is similar to the Z transform, with a simple change of variables, where the starred transform is explicitly declared in terms of the sampling period (T), while the Z transform is performed on a discrete signal and is independent of the sampling period. This makes the starred transform a de-normalized version of the one-sided Z-transform, as it restores the dependence on sampling parameter T.

Relation to Laplace transform 

Since , where:

This line integration is equivalent to integration in the positive sense along a closed contour formed by such a line and an infinite semicircle that encloses the poles of X(s) in the left half-plane of p. The result of such an integration (per the residue theorem) would be:

The result of such an integration would be:

Relation to Z transform 

Given a Z-transform, X(z), the corresponding starred transform is a simple substitution:

  

This substitution restores the dependence on T.

It's interchangeable,

Properties of the starred transform 

Citations

References 

Phillips and Nagle, "Digital Control System Analysis and Design", 3rd Edition, Prentice Hall, 1995. 

Transforms